A distinction without a difference is a type of logical fallacy where an author or speaker attempts to describe a distinction between two things where no discernible difference exists.  It is particularly used when a word or phrase has connotations associated with it that one party to an argument prefers to avoid.

Logical form
 Claim X is made where the truth of the claim requires a distinct difference between A and B.
 There is no distinct difference between A and B.
 Therefore, claim X is false:

Examples 
 "I did not lie; I merely stretched the truth a little bit."
 From the film This Is Spinal Tap:
 Marty: "The last time Tap toured America, they were, uh, booked into 10,000-seat arenas, and 15,000-seat venues, and it seems that now, on their current tour they're being booked into 1,200-seat arenas, 1,500-seat arenas, and uh I was just wondering, does this mean uh...the popularity of the group is waning?"
 Ian: "Oh, no, no, no, no, no, no...no, no, not at all. I, I, I just think that the... uh... their appeal is becoming more selective."

See also
 Distancing language
 Euphemism
 Spin (propaganda)

References

Conceptual distinctions
Difference
Formal fallacies